Thomas Spencer Baynes (24 March 1823 – 31 May 1887) was an English philosopher.

Life
Baynes was born in Wellington, Somerset to a Baptist minister. He intended to study for Baptist ministry, and was at a theological seminary at Bath with that view but, being strongly attracted to philosophical studies, left it and went to Edinburgh, where he became the favourite pupil of Sir William Hamilton, of whose philosophical system he continued an adherent.

After working as editor of a newspaper in Edinburgh, and after an interval of rest rendered necessary by a breakdown in health, Baynes resumed journalistic work in 1858 as assistant editor of the Daily News. In 1864 he was appointed Professor of Logic and English Literature at St Andrews University, in which capacity his mind was drawn to the study of Shakespeare, and he contributed to the Edinburgh Review and Fraser's Magazine valuable papers (chiefly relating to his vocabulary and the extent of his learning) afterwards collected as Shakespeare Studies.

In 1873, he was appointed to superintend the ninth edition of the Encyclopædia Britannica, a task with which, after 1880, he was assisted by William Robertson Smith. Baynes was the first English-born editor of the Britannica; all earlier editors were Scottish.

Notes

References

External links 
 
 1902 Encyclopedia - Articles and illustrations from Encyclopædia Britannica, 9th Edition, of which Baynes was joint editor

Encyclopædia Britannica
1823 births
1887 deaths
People from Wellington, Somerset
Alumni of the University of Edinburgh
Academics of the University of St Andrews